Koo is an Indian microblogging and social networking service, owned by Bangalore-based Bombinate Technologies. It was co-founded by entrepreneurs Aprameya Radhakrishna and Mayank Bidawatka. The app was launched in early 2020; it won the government's Atmanirbhar App Innovation Challenge which selected the best apps from some 7,000 entries across the country.

As of November 2022, the company is valued at over $275 million. Investors in Bombinate Technologies include Tiger Global, Blume Ventures, Kalaari Capital and Accel Partners India, and former Infosys CFO TV Mohandas Pai's 3one4 Capital.

History

Initial growth 
According to statistics provided by analytics provider Sensor Tower, Koo saw 26 lakh (2.6 million) installs from Indian app stores in 2020, compared to 2.8 crore (28 million) installs observed for Twitter. From February 6 to February 11, the installations of Koo increased rapidly. The app increased in popularity after a weeklong standoff between Twitter and the Government of India over Twitter's refusal to block accounts during the 2020–2021 Indian farmers' protest. The government demanded that Twitter block the accounts of hundreds of activists, journalists, and politicians, accusing them of spreading misinformation. Twitter complied with a majority of the orders, but refused some, citing freedom of expression. Following this standoff, many Cabinet Ministers such as Piyush Goyal and various government officials moved to Koo and urged supporters to follow. This led to a surge in Koo's user base. In April 2021, Ravi Shankar Prasad became the first minister with 25 lakh followers on Koo.

Koo was the go-to alternative to Twitter in Nigeria after the country indefinitely banned Twitter for deleting a tweet by Nigerian President Muhammadu Buhari. The tweet had threatened a crackdown on regional separatists "in the language they understand". Twitter claimed the post was in violation of Twitter rules, but gave no further details. Twitter was officially banned in Nigeria on June 5, 2021. The Government of Nigeria created their official Koo account five days later on June 10. In 2022, it was reported that Nigerian government officials had stopped using Koo after the ban on Twitter was lifted.

Koo in Brazil 
After crises involving the acquisition of Twitter by Elon Musk, Koo became an attractive social network for Brazilian users. According to one of the founders, Aprameya Radhakrishna, until the 16th of November, only two thousand Brazilian users used Koo, which placed Brazil in position 75 on the list of countries with the most lifetime unique users. On the 18th alone, more than a million Brazilians registered on the social network, which placed Brazil in second place on the list. The app featured at number 1 in the Google's Play Store and Apple's App Store in Brazil. Soon Portuguese support was added in the App. Koo received so many submissions and comments that the site became unstable. Personalities such as Felipe Neto, Casimiro, Bruno Gagliasso and Pocah created their accounts on the social network. The name "Koo", which has the same pronunciation as "cu", a vulgar term for buttocks in Portuguese language, drew attention of users. Koo held a poll on Twitter asking Brazilians if the name of the social network should be changed, which was rejected. Koo reached the Top 3 of Twitter's trending topics in Brazil.

Funding 

As of May 2021, Koo investors include Accel Partners, Kalaari Capital, Blume Ventures, Dream Incubator, 3one4 Capital, Blume Ventures, IIFL, and Mirae Asset. On 26 May 2021, Koo raised $30 million (about ₹218 crore) in Series B funding, led by Tiger Global. After raising $30 million from Tiger Global, Koo's valuation increased, reaching over $100 million, up from about $25 million in February. Shunwei Capital sold its whole stake in Koo by March 2021. On 25 November 2022, Koo further raised $6 million in a funding round led Accel Partners and Tiger Global.

Interface and features

Logo 
Koo's logo is a yellow bird. The design of the bird was streamlined on 14 May 2021.

User experience 
Koo's interface is similar to that of Twitter, allowing users to categorize their posts with hashtags and tag other users in mentions or replies. Koo uses a yellow and white interface.

On 4 May 2021, Koo introduced a new feature called "Talk to Type" which allows its users to create a post with the app's voice assistant.

Koo marks verified accounts with a yellow-coloured tick.

On 14 March 2023, the company integrated ChatGPT in Koo so that users can use it to create content and posts.

Languages 
Koo was first launched in Kannada and supports Hindi, English, Portuguese, Tamil, Telugu, Assamese, Marathi, Bangla, Gujarati, Punjabi, Hausa.

Security incidents 
In February 2021, a cybersecurity expert showed a data breach on the app, but the company rejected the claim.

On November 19, 2022, an update caused a vulnerability allowing profiles to be hacked. KooForBrasil's Twitter profile admitted the failure and apologized saying that there had never been an invasion before.

Reception 

 2020 - Koo got Rank 2 in the Government of India's 'Atmanirbhar Bharat App Innovation Challenge' in the Social category.
 2021 - Koo was ranked among the Top 3 social media products in APAC (Asia-pacific) region as per the Amplitude report.
 2022 - Koo CEO Aprameya Radhakrishnan was recognized as the Top 100 global tech changemakers

See also
ShareChat

References

External links 

Internet properties established in 2020
Indian social networking websites
Microblogging services
Multilingual websites